Cobre Panamá is a large open-pit copper mine in Panama, located 120 kilometres west of Panama City and 20 kilometres from the Caribbean Sea coast, in the district of Donoso, Colon province, in the Republic of Panama. The mine consists of four zones totalling 13,600 hectares. The main deposits are at Balboa, Botija, Colina and Valle Grande. With 3.1 billion tonnes of proven and probable reserves, Cobre Panama is one of the largest new copper mines opened globally since 2010. It is located next to the Petaquilla mine.  

This mine project was owned by Inmet Mining until 2013, when this company was taken over by First Quantum Minerals Ltd. (FQM). Construction continued over the next six years until 2019. Cobre Panama represents a total US$6.2 billion investment, partly financed by deposits in the amount of US$1'356 million from Franco-Nevada against future deliveries of gold and silver produced by the mine. 
 
Commercial production started in June 2019. At full current capacity, the plant will process 85Mtpa of ore to produce more than 300,000 tonnes of copper per year along with gold, silver and molybdenum. This is equivalent to 1.5% of global copper production as of 2023. The operation has a 34-year mine life. The three 28 megawatt SAG mills and four 16.5 megawatt ball mills installed at Cobre Panama are the largest installed in the world up to the year 2020, except for the Sentinel mine in Zambia, also owned by First Quantum Minerals. The project is powered by a 300 megawatt power generation plant located at a new port built for this mining operation.

Ownership
As of 2017, First Quantum Minerals Ltd. has a 90 per cent equity interest in Minera Panamá, S.A. ("MPSA"), the Panamanian company that holds the Cobre Panama concession. The remaining equity is owned by Korea Resources Corp. (KORES, 10%).

Concession
The original concession granted to Minera Panamá, S.A. ("MPSA") in February 1996 and affirmed by Panamanian contract-Law No. 9 in 1997 became questionable after a ruling of the Supreme Court of Panama in September 2018, that Law 9 is in conflict with the constitution of Panama. Shortly thereafter, the Government of Panama issued a statement affirming support for Cobre Panama and considering the MPSA mining concession as valid. On 22 December 2021, the Official Gazette published the unconstitutionality of Law 9. MPSA and First Quantum Minerals claim, that the ruling concerning Law 9 is not retrospective, so that the contracts signed before 2018 are not affected. During January 2022, the Government of Panama made proposals for a new contract including future payments and royalties to be imposed on MPSA. Such an agreement would have to be approved as legislation by the National Assembly.
First Quantum's subsidiary MPSA made proposals favorable to the Government of Panamá including yearly payments of US$375 million in tax and royalty revenue. These payments were offered under the conditions that metal prices and profitability of this mine would not drop significantly. The Government of Panama announced plans to order suspension of operations at this mine after First Quantum missed a deadline for an agreement to increase its payments to the government. The original contract and others the government has, have been viewed by many analysts as too generous for business.

References 

Copper mines in Panama
Buildings and structures in Colón Province